Selivanovo is a rural locality (a village) in Ust-Alexeyevskoye Rural Settlement, Velikoustyugsky District, Vologda Oblast, Russia. The population was 7 as of 2002.

Geography 
Selivanovo is located 62 km southeast of Veliky Ustyug (the district's administrative centre) by road. Antonovo is the nearest rural locality.

References 

Rural localities in Velikoustyugsky District